Sankey, also spelled Sanchi, Zanchi may refer to:

People:
Bishop Sankey (b 1992), American football running back
Ben Sankey (b 1976), American football quarterback
Ben Sankey (1907–2001), American baseball player
Clarence Sankey (1913–1996), Australian cricketer
David Sankey, Pennsylvanian state senator
Derek Sankey (b 1948), Canadian basketball player
Herbert Stuart Sankey (1854–1940), British barrister and politician
Ira D. Sankey (1840–1908), American gospel singer and composer
Jay Sankey, Canadian magician
Jerome Sankey, English Civil War soldier and politician
John Sankey, 1st Viscount Sankey (1866–1948),  British politician
John Sankey, Australian heavy metal drummer
 Joseph Sankey (b 1826), founder of Joseph Sankey & Sons Ltd. later part of GKN.
Matthew Henry Phineas Riall Sankey (1853–1926), Irish engineer and creator of the Sankey diagram
Maurie Sankey (1940–1965), Australian rules football player
Philip Sankey (1830–1909), English clergyman and cricketer
Richard Hieram Sankey (1829–1908), Irish engineer and major general in British India
Sara Sankey (born 1967), English badminton player
Stuart Sankey (1927–2000), American double bass player and teacher
Tom Sankey (1891–1974), English footballer
Tom Sankey (d 2010), American folk singer
Tommy Sankey (b 1980), Republican member of the Pennsylvania House of Representatives.
Verne Sankey (1890–1934), American Depression-era outlaw
William Sankey (1822–1892), British army officer

Places:
Great Sankey, Warrington, England
Sankey Canal, Lancashire, England
Sankey railway station, Warrington, England
Sankey Tank, a man-made lake in Bangalore, India

Other uses:
Sankey brick, a brick made in Pittsburgh, Pennsylvania
Sankey diagram, depicting extensive flows in their correct proportions
Sankey Viaduct, a railway viaduct at St Helens, Merseyside, England
GKN Sankey F.C., an English football club previously known as Sankeys of Wellington
Sankeys (nightclub), a nightclub in Manchester
The standard coupler for commercial beer kegs

See also
Sankey diagram, which summarises all the energy transfers taking place in a process